Cooch Behar railway station (also referred to as Old Cooch Behar railway station) serves Cooch Behar in Cooch Behar district in the Indian state of West Bengal.

History
Cooch Behar State Railway built a -wide narrow-gauge railway from the southern bank of the Torsa opposite Cooch Behar town to Gitaldaha, a station on the tracks of Eastern Bengal Railway in 1894. Cooch Behar town was connected in 1901 after a bridge was built on the Torsa. It was converted to -wide metre gauge in 1910. Northeast Frontier Railway converted the Alipurduar–Bamanhat branch line to  broad gauge in 2007.

Railway heritage museum
The more than a century old Cooch Behar railway station has been accorded a heritage status and a new building was built to accommodate a Railway Heritage Museum.

References

External links

Alipurduar railway division
Railway stations in Cooch Behar district
1901 establishments in India
Cooch Behar